Menge  may refer to:

 Menge (woreda), a municipality in western Ethiopia
 Menge, Ethiopia, a town in western Ethiopia
 Menge House Complex, a historic home located at Dolgeville in Herkimer County, New York
 Saint-Menge, a commune in the Vosges department in Lorraine in northeastern France
 3740 Menge, a Main-belt Asteroid discovered on March 1, 1981
 People
 Franz Anton Menge (1808–1880), a German entomologist
 Johann Menge (1788–1852), South Australia's first geologist
 Wolfgang Menge (1924-2012), a German journalist and television director

See also
 Menges (disambiguation)